Grapholita zariae is a moth of the family Tortricidae. It is found in Nigeria.

The wingspan is about 11 mm. The ground colour of the forewings is white, suffused and strigulated (finely streaked) with blackish grey and partially with white at the mid-dorsum. The costal strigulae are concolorous with the ground colour and there are three blackish marks on a grey ground at the mid-termen. The hindwings are pale whitish brown, but transparent basally.

Etymology
The species name refers to Zaria, the type locality.

References

Moths described in 2013
Grapholitini